Macrodasys is a genus of gastrotrichs belonging to the family Macrodasyidae.

The species of this genus are found in Europe, Central America, India.

Species:

Macrodasys achradocytalis 
Macrodasys acrosorus 
Macrodasys affinis 
Macrodasys caudatus

References

Gastrotricha